Konrad Stockmeier (born 3 May 1977) is a German economist and politician of the Free Democratic Party (FDP) who has been serving as a member of the Bundestag since 2021.

Early life and career
Stockmeier was born in 1977 in the West German city of Heidelberg. From 2003 to 2009, he worked as scientific assistant at the University of Hagen and RWTH Aachen University.

Political career
Stockmeier joined the FDP in 1998. He became a member of the Bundestag in the 2021 elections, representing the Mannheim district. In parliament, he has since been serving on the Committee on European Affairs and the Committee on Climate Action and Energy.

Other activities
 German Industry Initiative for Energy Efficiency (DENEFF), Member of the Parliamentary Advisory Board

References 

Living people
Politicians from Heidelberg
1977 births
Free Democratic Party (Germany) politicians
21st-century German politicians
Members of the Bundestag 2021–2025